Trophy Kids may refer to:

 Trophy Kids (2011 film), a film about children with unrealistic expectations
 Trophy Kids (2013 film), a documentary about overbearing parents in sports